Tavastia or Tavastland may refer to:

 Häme (Swedish: Tavastland, Latin: Tavastia) 
 Tavastia (historical province), a historical province of the kingdom of Sweden, located in modern-day Finland
 Tavastia (constituency), formerly Tavastia South, Finland
 Tavastia Proper, a modern region of Finland
 Päijänne Tavastia, a modern region of Finland
 Tavastia Club, a rock music club in Helsinki, Finland
 MV Tavastland, a ship

See also
Hämeenmaa (disambiguation)
Tavastians, people from Tavastia
Tavastum